Bismite is a bismuth oxide mineral, bismuth trioxide or Bi2O3. It is a monoclinic mineral, but the typical form of occurrence is massive and clay-like with no macroscopic crystals. The color varies from green to yellow. It has a Mohs hardness of 4 to 5 and a specific gravity of 8.5 to 9.5, quite high for a nonmetallic mineral.

Bismite is a secondary oxidation zone mineral which forms from primary bismuth minerals.

It was first described from Goldfield, Nevada in 1868, and later from the Schneeberg District, Ore Mountains, Saxony, Germany.

See also
Bismuth trioxide — details on the chemistry of this substance.

References

Mindat localities
Webmineral.com: Bismite

Bismuth minerals
Oxide minerals
Goldfield, Nevada
Monoclinic minerals
Minerals in space group 14